Braeside Park is a  metropolitan, recreational and conservation park in the south-eastern Melbourne suburb of Braeside.

History
Before European settlement, the Bunurong people lived in and around the area for thousands of years. In 1851, the Colony of Victoria was established after separation from New South Wales; leases leases held by squatters were withdrawn and the land was surveyed, divided into portions and auctioned. The park since had a history of various owners and land uses. In 1982, Parks Victoria, assumed responsibility for Braeside park.

Geography
The park's natural environment includes wetlands, heathlands and red gum woodlands.

The wetlands are made up of herbaceous native and introduced plant species which provide habitat for water-dependent birds. The heathland is located on sandy well-drained soil with vegetation including trees (mostly the manna gum), shrubs, sedges, grasses, groundcovers and herbs. The red gum woodlands consists of river red gums and a grassland of introduced grasses, mostly pasture grasses, due to the area's history of cattle grazing.

Features
The park contains multi-use trails, a picnic area, tree stump art carvings and a community garden. Braeside Park has a 24-hour car park at the entrance to the park from Lower Dandenong Road.

The park's wetlands are also a popular birdwatching location. Birds such as the pacific black duck, pied cormorant, spotted pardalote and whistling kite can be found in the area. The park also fields the   Heathland Conservation Zone, a restricted-access area aiming to preserve and enhance the remnant natural features and cultural resources of the heathland habitat.

References

External links 
 http://www.braesideparkfriends.org.au/
 http://parkweb.vic.gov.au/explore/parks/braeside-park

Parks in Melbourne
City of Kingston (Victoria)